Around the Horn with Maynard Ferguson is an album led by Canadian jazz trumpeter Maynard Ferguson featuring tracks recorded in 1955 and 1956 and released on the EmArcy label.

Reception

AllMusic awarded the album 4 stars and its review by Scott Yanow states, "Ferguson gets to show off his versatility (including playing some credible blues) and takes a spot-on bass trumpet on "Mrs. Pitlack Regrets."

Track listing
All compositions by Bill Holman
 "Mrs. Pitlack Regrets" - 3:11
 "Never You Mind" - 3:28
 "Pork Pie" - 3:27
 "Dream Boat" - 2:51
 "Well, Hardly Ever" - 3:26
 "The Roamin' Showman" - 3:05
 "Dancing Nitely" - 3:11
 "Ain't Life Grand" - 3:11
 "Idyll" - 3:17
 "Open Sesame" - 3:08
 "C'est La Blues" - 3:57
 "Wildman" - 3:12
Recorded at Capitol Studios in Los Angeles, CA on November 7, 1955 (tracks 6 & 10–12), November 10, 1955 (tracks 5 & 7–9), May 7, 1956 (tracks 1, 2 & 4) and May 12, 1956 (track 3)

Personnel 
Maynard Ferguson - trumpet, bass trumpet, valve trombone
Buddy Childers, Ray Linn - trumpet
Bob Burgess - trombone
Herb Geller - alto saxophone
Georgie Auld, Bill Holman - tenor saxophone
Bud Shank - baritone saxophone
Lorraine Geller - piano
Buddy Clark (tracks 1–4), Ray Brown (tracks 5–12) - bass
Al Stoller - drums

References 

1956 albums
Maynard Ferguson albums
EmArcy Records albums